Australianism may refer to:
 Australian English words or phrases
 Culture of Australia